Boite mac Cináeda ("Boite son of Kenneth"; also, Bodhe, Boedhe, etc.; d. 1058) was a Scottish prince, son of either King Kenneth II of Scotland (Cináed mac Maíl Coluim) or King Kenneth III of Scotland (Cináed mac Duib).

He was the father of Gruoch of Scotland and friend to Findláech of Moray, Macbeth of Scotland's father. He arranged the marriage of Macbeth and Gruoch in 1032, which permitted Macbeth to assume the throne of Scotland in 1040. Later, he was behind the short-lived ascension of his grandson, Lulach, to the throne in 1057.

A fictional version of this character appeared in the animated television series Gargoyles.

References

1058 deaths
Scottish royalty
Medieval princes
Place of birth missing
Scottish princes
Year of birth unknown
Sons of kings